James Lynam (born 1 October 1925) is an Irish former hurler who played for club side Glen Rovers and at inter-county level with the Cork senior hurling team.

Career

A member of the Glen Rovers club in Blackpool, Lynam had just turned 19 when he won his first County Championship title in 1944. He claimed a further six winners' medals before his retirement from the club scene in 1960. Lynam first played for the Cork senior hurling team when he was selected as a reserve for the 1950 Munster Championship. He won the first of successive Munster Championship medals in 1952, before claiming his first All-Ireland title after coming on as a substitute for Liam  Abernethy in the 1952 final defeat of Dublin. Lynam collected further silverware with a National League title in 1953, before winning a second All-Ireland title, this time as a reserve, after Cork's defeat of Galway in the 1953 final.

Honours

Glen Rovers
Cork Senior Hurling Championship: 1944, 1945, 1948, 1949, 1953, 1954, 1960

Cork
All-Ireland Senior Hurling Championship: 1952, 1953
Munster Senior Hurling Championship: 1952, 1953
National Hurling League: 1952-53

References

1925 births
Living people
All-Ireland Senior Hurling Championship winners
Cork inter-county hurlers
Dual players
Glen Rovers hurlers
St Nicholas' Gaelic footballers